Eterusia taiwana is a moth of the family Zygaenidae. It is found in Taiwan.

The wingspan is 58–60 mm. Adults are characterized by the bright green forewing in which the two spots in the discoidal cell and the cell CuA are shifted to the discocellular spot. In males, the basal spot of the forewing is absent and the dorsal surface of the abdomen is unicoloured yellow, except for the basal and distal parts.

References

Moths described in 1911
Chalcosiinae
Moths of Taiwan